The inferior mesenteric ganglion is a ganglion located near where the inferior mesenteric artery branches from the abdominal aorta.

Additional images

See also
Superior mesenteric ganglion

References

External links
 
 

Sympathetic nervous system